Bis-tris propane, or 1,3-bis(tris(hydroxymethyl)methylamino)propane, also known as BTP, is a chemical substance that is used in buffer solutions.  It is a white to off-white crystalline powder that is soluble in water.  It has a wide buffering range, from 6 to 9.5 due to its two pKa values which are close in value.  This buffer is primarily used in biochemistry and molecular biology.

Applications
A review of DNA polymerase fidelity cites bis-tris propane as a suitable buffer for polymerase chain reaction (PCR).  Bis-Tris propane has also been used with HCl buffer for stabilization of farnesyl diphosphate isolated from a strain of Saccharomyces cerevisiae.  It has also been used in a study of the effects of buffer identity on electric signals of light-excited bacteriorhodopsin.  Use of Bis-Tris propane has also been documented in an investigation of the MgATPase activity of the myosin subfragment 1 monomer.  The effect of buffer identity on the kinetics of the restriction enzyme EcoRV has been studied in various buffers, including Bis-Tris propane. Bis-Tris propane wide buffering range is also useful for calibration of genetically encoded pH indicators expressed in the cytosol or mitochondria. Bis-Tris propane has been used as the buffering agent in separation of full and empty capsids of recombinant adeno-associated virus vectors with anion-exchange chromatography.

See also 
Bis-tris methane
Tris
Tricine

References 

Amines
Polyols
Buffer solutions